Hancock Township may refer to:

 Hancock Township, Hancock County, Illinois
 Hancock Township, Plymouth County, Iowa
 Hancock Township, Osborne County, Kansas, in Osborne County, Kansas
 Hancock Township, Michigan
 Hancock Township, Carver County, Minnesota

Township name disambiguation pages